Ice Energy was an energy storage company serving utility companies in California. Its main  product was the Ice Bear system, developed for small to mid-sized commercial buildings. The Ice Bear freezes water at night when electricity is cheaper and uses that ice for space cooling during the day.

History 

Ice Energy was founded in 2003.  The assets of Ice Energy were reformed into Ice Energy Holdings in 2012. In August 2014, Ice Energy revealed a version of the Ice Bear for single-family homes called the Ice Cub. In November, the company won sixteen contracts with Southern California Edison. The contracts totaled 25.6 megawatts.

In December 2019, the company filed for Chapter 7 bankruptcy.

See also 

 Energy storage
 List of energy storage projects

References

External links

 

 Energy Storage System website

Energy storage
Energy companies of the United States
Energy in California
Companies based in Santa Barbara, California
American companies established in 2003
Energy companies established in 2003
2003 establishments in California
Companies that have filed for Chapter 7 bankruptcy